Sclavonia may refer to:

 Sclavonia, archaic English (via Latin) designation for the region of Slavonia, now part of Croatia
 Sclavonia, archaic English (via Latin) designation for the region of Scalovia, in former Prussia
 Occasionally, parts of the Kingdom of Hungary (Upper Hungary), inhabited by Slovaks
 In general, a common Latin designation for various regions inhabited by Sclavoni (Slavs)

See also
 Sclavi (disambiguation)
 Sclavia (disambiguation)
 Slavia (disambiguation)
 Slavija (disambiguation)